is the remains of a castle structure in Yonago, Tottori Prefecture, Japan.

The castle was used by Yukimatsu clan as their main bastion. Later, the castle was expanded and improved the defences by the Mōri clan's vassal Sugihara Morishige. It is said that Yamanaka Yukimori was captured and put in prison in the castle but later he succeeded in escape from the castle.

Odaka Castle was demolished when Yonago Castle was completed and Nakamura Kazutada moved there. Its ruins have been protected as a City's Historic Sites.

References

Castles in Shimane Prefecture
Historic Sites of Japan
Former castles in Japan
Mōri clan
Amago clan
Ruined castles in Japan